The Sauer S 1900 UL is a 4 stroke aircraft engine for homebuilt and ultralight aircraft.

Design and development
The engine is based on the Volkswagen air-cooled engine. It is extensively modified for aircraft use and all the parts are custom made. The engine is derived from the certified engines produced by the same manufacturer and used in several motorgliders and light aircraft.

Applications
Skyranger SW

Specifications

See also
Sauer Engines

References

External links
 

S1900UL